Parvaneh (also Romanized as Parvāneh and Parvanēh; also known as Parvānd) is a village in Oshnavieh-ye Shomali Rural District, in the Central District of Oshnavieh County, West Azerbaijan Province, Iran. At the 2006 census, its population was 165, in 36 families.

References 

Populated places in Oshnavieh County